Nand Lal (born 16 April 1954) is an Indian politician, who currently serves as MLA from Rampur constituency. He is associated with Indian National Congress. He is son of Pyare Lal. He was born at Deothi (Rampur Bushahr), Distt. Shimla. He is a Post Graduate in Political Science from Himachal Pradesh University, Shimla. He is married to Smt. Satya.

Political Standing 
After completing Basic Training Course from I.T.B.P. Academy, Nand Lal was inducted into Commando Contingent, (I.T.B.P.); actively involved in the security arrangement to International events i.e. Asiad, 1982, ii) Non-Aligned Meet, 1983, and iii) Commonwealth Conference, 1984; Commanded ITBP Battalion in highly militant infested areas of Jammu and Kashmir (twice); was involved in the development of a village near Delhi adopted under ‘Village Adoption Scheme’, Govt. of India; organized medical camps and undertook developmental work under Border Area Development Programme; worked also for inculcating a sense of security amongst the people of Jammu & Kashmir and Arunachal Pradesh.

Nand Lal Joined S.P.G., in 1985 and remained in it till 1997; received letter of appreciation from the former Prime Ministers late Shri Rajiv Gandhi  and Shri Chander Shekhar, in recognition of his distinguished services; was felicitated also by the Govt. of Arunachal Pradesh in appreciation of his contributions to the security and development of the State; recipient also of ‘President Police Medal’ (twice) for fighting against militancy and for his outstanding services during 2001 and 2007 respectively. Sought voluntary retirement from Central Govt. Service in 2007 and joined Indian National Congress in order to better serve the people of his constituency.

Elected to the Himachal pradesh State Legislative Assembly in 2007; remained member, Subordinate Legislation & Privilege Committees. He was re-elected to the State Legislative Assembly in December 2012; appointed chairman, Privilege Committee and thereafter Chief Parliamentary Secretary. He won by a margin of 9471 votes. Prem Singh Draik of Bharatiya Janata Party was the trailing candidate.

He commanded an ITBP Battalion in the highly militant-presence areas of Jammu and Kashmir (twice) and is the recipient of the President Police Medal  for meritorious services and for fighting militancy. He was also felicitated by the Arunachal Pradesh government in appreciation of his contribution to the security and development of the state.

Married to Satya, he has one son who is a political and a social worker. Widely travelled, Nand Lal has visited over a dozen countries. Reading, horticulture, sports and cultural activities are his favourite pastimes. He loves interacting with people from the remote and border areas.

Constituency Represented 
Rampur Bushahr is a municipal council in Shimla district. It is about 130 km from Shimla, connected with National Highway which passes through Narkanda.

Nand lal's Election Records

References 

Indian National Congress politicians from Himachal Pradesh
Living people
1954 births